John Anthony Tyler (July 30, 1906 in Mount Pleasant, Pennsylvania – July 11, 1972 in Mount Pleasant, Pennsylvania) was a Major League Baseball player who played outfield for the Boston Braves in  and .

References

External links

1906 births
1972 deaths
People from Mount Pleasant, Pennsylvania
Major League Baseball outfielders
Baseball players from Pennsylvania
Boston Braves players
Scottdale Cardinals players
American expatriate baseball players in Canada
Buffalo Bisons (minor league) players
Canton Terriers players
Charleston Senators players
Erie Sailors players
Greensboro Patriots players
Harrisburg Senators players
Knoxville Smokies players
Memphis Chickasaws players
Rochester Red Wings players
San Antonio Missions players
Scranton Miners players
Syracuse Chiefs players
Toronto Maple Leafs (International League) players
Wilkes-Barre Barons (baseball) players
Williamsport Grays players